Tianning Temple may refer to two temples in China:

Tianning Temple (Beijing), in Guang'anmen, Beijing
Tianning Temple (Changzhou), in Changzhou, Jiangsu

Buddhist temple disambiguation pages